Fanna (Standard Friulian: ;

Fanna borders the following municipalities: Arba, Cavasso Nuovo, Frisanco, Maniago.

References

Cities and towns in Friuli-Venezia Giulia